The Six Pieces for Piano, Op. 118, are some of the most beloved compositions that Johannes Brahms wrote for solo piano. Completed in 1893 and dedicated to Clara Schumann, the collection is the penultimate composition published during Brahms' lifetime. It is also his penultimate work composed for piano solo. Consistent with Brahms's other late keyboard works, Op. 118 is more introspective than his earlier piano pieces, which tend to be more virtuosic in character. The six pieces are:
 Intermezzo in A minor. Allegro non assai, ma molto appassionato
 Intermezzo in A major. Andante teneramente
 Ballade in G minor. Allegro energico
 Intermezzo in F minor. Allegretto un poco agitato
 Romanze in F major. Andante
 Intermezzo in E minor. Andante, largo e mesto

External links
 A public domain engraving of the second piece using GNU LilyPond is available from the Mutopia Project in several formats.
 
 Detailed Listening Guide using the recording by Martin Jones
 Recordings of Klavierstucke Op.118 are available from the Piano Society as well as from this website.

Piano pieces by Johannes Brahms
Compositions for solo piano
1893 compositions